Tetraethyl orthosilicate, formally named tetraethoxysilane (TEOS), ethyl silicate is the organic chemical compound with the formula Si(OC2H5)4. TEOS is a colorless liquid. It degrades in water. It is the most prevalent alkoxide of silicon.

TEOS is a tetrahedral molecule. Like its many analogues, it is prepared by alcoholysis of silicon tetrachloride:
SiCl4  +  4 EtOH → Si(OEt)4  +  4 HCl
where Et is the ethyl group, C2H5, and thus EtOH is ethanol.

Applications
TEOS is mainly used as a crosslinking agent in silicone polymers and as a precursor to silicon dioxide in the semiconductor industry.

TEOS is also used as the silica source for synthesis of some zeolites. Other applications include coatings for carpets and other objects. TEOS is used in the production of aerogel. These applications exploit the reactivity of the Si-OR bonds. TEOS has historically been used as an additive to alcohol based rocket fuels to decrease the heat flux to the chamber wall of regeneratively cooled engines by over 50%.

TEOS is used in steel casting industry as an inorganic binder and stiffener for making silica-based ceramic molding forms (see also sodium silicate).

As inorganic binder for coatings (passivation) of different materials such as steel, glass, brass, and even wood in order to make surfaces water-, oxygen- and high-temperature resistant.

As additive to solid polymers to enhance adhesiveness to glass, steel or wood.

As a binder for porcelian teeth crowns.

As precursor to siloxanes.

Other reactions
TEOS easily converts to silicon dioxide upon the addition of water:
Si(OC2H5)4 + 2 H2O → SiO2  +  4 C2H5OH
An idealized equation is shown, in reality the silica produced is hydrated.  This hydrolysis reaction is an example of a sol-gel process. The side product is ethanol. The reaction proceeds via a series of condensation reactions that convert the TEOS molecule into a mineral-like solid via the formation of Si-O-Si linkages. Rates of this conversion are sensitive to the presence of acids and bases, both of which serve as catalysts. The Stöber process allows the formation of monodisperse and mesoporous silica.

At elevated temperatures (>600 °C), TEOS converts to silicon dioxide:
Si(OC2H5)4   →   SiO2  +  2 (C2H5)2O
The volatile coproduct is diethyl ether.

Storage 
TEOS is stored in hermetic steel vessels at temperatures up to 30°С.

Safety
TEOS has low toxicity by ingestion. While tetramethoxysilane  is highly damaging to eyes since it deposits silica, TEOS is much less so due to lower hydrolysis rate of the ethoxy groups.

References

External links
NIST Standard Reference Database 69, June 2005 Release: NIST Chemistry WebBook
CDC – NIOSH Pocket Guide to Chemical Hazards

Ethoxides
Silicate esters